Shah-Ali Bridge, is a world heritage site, a part of Shushtar Historical Hydraulic System, located in the island city Shushtar Khouzestan, Iran from the Safavid era. It  was registered on UNESCO's list of World Heritage Sites in 2009 and is Iran's 10th cultural heritage site to be registered on the United Nations' list together with the 12 other historical bridges, dams, canals, watermills and buildings as Shushtar Historical Hydraulic System. The bridge is located close to Lashkar Bridge.

Sources 

World Heritage Sites in Iran
Buildings and structures in Khuzestan Province
Bridges in Iran
Water supply and sanitation in Iran
Tourist attractions in Khuzestan Province